The following are the national records in Olympic weightlifting in Belarus. Records are maintained in each weight class for the snatch lift, clean and jerk lift, and the total for both lifts by the Belarus Weightlifting Union.

Current records
Key to tables:

Men

Women

Historical records

Men (1998–2018)

Women (1998–2018)

 Oleshchuk failed the competition doping test and the IWF canceled the results, the BWU however still lists them as records

References
General
Belarusian records 21 December 2022 updated
Specific

External links
Belarusian Weightlifting Union

records
Belarus
Olympic weightlifting
weightlifting